Karin Aurivillius (1920–1982) was a Swedish chemist and crystallographer at the University of Lund, Sweden.  She determined the crystal structures of many mercury compounds.

During the 1960s, she helped develop crystallography in Sweden while working closely with her prominent husband and fellow chemist, Bengt Aurivillius (1918–1994), who was a professor of inorganic chemistry at Lund University.

To reveal the structural chemistry of inorganic mercury (II) oxide or sulphide compounds, she studied crystal structures using X-rays and neutron diffraction methods. Some of her research was conducted at the Institute of Atomic Energy Research at the Atomic Energy Research Establishment (AERE) located in Didcot, Oxfordshire, United Kingdom.

Honors 
The extremely rare mineral aurivilliusite was named in honor of Karin Aurivillius, for "her significant contributions to the crystal chemistry of mercury-bearing inorganic compounds." The mineral is dark grey-black with a dark red-brown streak and has been found at a small prospect pit near the abandoned Clear Creek mercury mine, New Idria district, San Benito County, California.

Selected works 

 Aurivillius, K. A. R. I. N. "The crystal structure of mercury (II) oxide studied by X-ray and neutron diffraction methods." Acta Chemica Scandinavica 10 (1956): 852–866.
 Aurivillius, Karin. The structural chemistry of inorganic mercury (II) compounds: some aspects of the determination of the positions of" light" atoms in the presence of" heavy" atoms in crystal structures. Diss. 1965.
 Aurivillius, K. A. R. I. N., and INCA-BRETT Carlsson. "The structure of hexagonal mercury (II) oxide." Acta Chemica Scandinavica 12 (1958): 1297.
 Aurivillius, Karin, and Bo Arne Nilsson. "The crystal structure of mercury (II) phosphate, Hg3 (PO4) 2." Z. Kristallogr 141.1-2 (1975): 1-10.
 Aurivillius, Karin, and Claes Stålhandske. "A reinvestigation of the crystal structures of HgSO4 and CdSO4." Zeitschrift für Kristallographie-Crystalline Materials 153.1-2 (1980): 121–129.
 Aurivillius, K. A. R. I. N., and L. E. N. A. Folkmarson. "The crystal structure of terlinguaite Hg4O2Cl2." Acta Chemica Scandinavica 22 (1968): 2529–2540.
 AURIVILLIUS, KARIN, and BIRGITTA MALMROS. "Studies on sulphates, selenates and chromates of mercury (II)." Acta Chem. Scand 15.9 (1961): 1932–1938.
 Aurivillius, K. A. R. I. N., and G-I. Bertinsson. "Structures of complexes between metal halides and phosphinothioethers or related ligands. X.[1, 9-Bis (diphenylphosphino)-3, 7-dithianonane] monoiodonickel tetraphenylborate." Acta Crystallographica Section B: Structural Crystallography and Crystal Chemistry 36.4 (1980): 790–794.

References 

1920 births
1982 deaths
20th-century Swedish chemists
Swedish women chemists
20th-century Swedish women scientists